The Kisima Music Awards is an annual awards program that recognises musical talent in East Africa. Despite being Kenyan-based the scheme awards artists from a variety of countries, predominantly Kenya, Uganda and Tanzania, and incorporates a range of music genres.

History

Named after the Swahili word for "well" the Kisima Awards was founded by Pete Odera and Tedd Josiah in 1994. The scheme initially aimed to recognise outstanding achievement in the performing arts and associated spheres such as education and business, and was held locally at Nairobi's Braeburn Theatre with clay trophies being awarded. This process continued annually with the awards being held at the Carnivore Restaurant, however in 1997 the scheme was discontinued.

The awards were revitalised in 2003, with organisers arranging to coincide its events with the Fête de la Musique. With increased funding and support from both government and sponsors the new scheme featured updated nomination and voting processes, larger award ceremonies held at a customised Kisima Dome tent and targeted artists from across the nation. However rather than all performing arts the new awards now recognised only musical talent. 

In 2004 the scheme was expanded to incorporate artists from all of East Africa, no longer restricting the talent to Kenya, and subsequently recognised musicians from Uganda and Tanzania. In 2005 Tedd Josiah stepped down as CEO of the awards amid controversy surrounding his winning of the Best Producer Award, appointing Victor Mayeya Odwori in his place.

The awards have since continued to expand, attracting international entrants and personalities, and have come to be an integral part of both Kenyan music and culture. However, the 2008 event was repeatedly delayed and eventually held a year later.

Awards process

Categories

The Kisima Music Awards aim to cover a diverse range of music genres and the variety of roles within production. The categories have changed regularly since 2003, however those frequently recognised within the scheme are:

 Best artist/group performing:
 Afro-fusion
 Asian Music
 Boomba Rap
 Boomba Pop
 Contemporary Gospel
 Eastern Benga
 Western Benga
 Hip hop
 R&B
 Rap
 Reggae/Ragga
 Traditional
 Best Artist/Group from Kenya/Tanzania/Uganda nb: separate award for each country
 Best Music Video Kenya/Tanzania/Uganda nb: separate award for each country
 Best Song
 Best Album
 Best Collaboration
 Best Male Performer
 Best Female Performer
 Most Promising Performer
 Best Group
 Producer of the Year
 Most Socially Aware Artist

Nomination and voting

Artists, groups and producers are able to nominate themselves for an award or be nominated, although they must approve the latter. To be eligible for nomination artists must have worked on a song or album that has been released in the year prior to the entry. A hard copy of the nominee's profile, photographs and a sample CD/cassette is required with the entry form.

After the cut off date for nomination all entries are screened for eligibility and categories are determined based on the field of contestants. A "nomination academy" made up of recognised members of the East African music scene then reduce each category to 4–5 finalists based on artistic flair and technical achievement, sales and chart positions are not taken into account during nomination.

The winners within each category are determined by a twofold voting system. The first is a percentage of the final score allocated to the nomination academy who individually vote for their preferred artist/group. The second is a larger percentage allocated to the general public who vote via SMS for their favourite artist after having access to various music samples on the official website. All the votes go to an independent auditing firm who determine the final winner.

Ceremony

The pinnacle of the awards process is the gala night, in which winners are announced and receive their trophies. The contestants and audience, a crowd of thousands drawn from both influential media, political and cultural personalities and paying members of the general public, are also treated to a variety of acts including musical performances, comedy routines and acrobatics. The night itself can last for up to six hours and is broadcast across Africa by satellite television Channel O.

After the gala night a winner's concert is held open to the public. Artists have also been called on to participate in tours in reflection of the social responsibility of the awards

Social responsibility

The awards aim to foster social responsibility with both artists and their audience. This is achieved through presentations and speeches at the gala night, the recognition of a category dedicated to social awareness and charity concerts and tours held after the event. Through this the organisers hope to use music to improve conditions and reduce poverty in Africa.

Kisima Music Trust

The governing body behind the awards is the Kisima Music Trust. It operates as a non-profit body and aims to bring stability to the Kenyan music scene and to encourage artists to perform both domestically and internationally. The organisation derives most of its funding from sponsorship, with the largest donors including:
 Kenya Government
 Capital FM
 3 Mice
 Deloitte
 Baraka FM
 Nu-Metro Cinema
 TMX
 Phat buzz
 Init
 Mac & More Solutions
 Radar
 Numetro Media Store

Kisima Award winners

Please see the respective page or website for the winners of that year

2003 Kisima Music Awards
2004 Kisima Music Awards
2005 Kisima Music Awards
2006 Kisima Music Awards
2007 Kisima Music Awards

The 2012 winners included Nameless as top Fusion Artiste (also winner of the "Lifetime Achievement Award"), Daddy Owen as top Gospel Artiste, Avril as top Boomba Artiste, Nonini as Hip Hop Artiste, Wyre as top Ragga Reggae Artiste, Camp Mulla as Upcoming Group, P-Unit and Sauti Sol as top Collaboration, Willie Owusu for top Music Video (Color Kwa Face - Nonini), Chameleone for East African Recognition Award, and Daddy Owen / Denno as Artiste / Group of the Year.  The full list of nominees is also available on the award website.

Controversy

The Kisima Awards have experienced their share of controversy.

In 2004 the then CEO of the scheme Tedd Josiah received the award for Best Producer, and faced allegations of "swinging himself an award". He subsequently resigned citing a conflict of interest, and claimed he had pleaded with the judges not to allow him in the category.

Musicians and producers such as Lydia Achieng Abura have also been critical of the voting system used to decide the awards, citing that SMS was predominantly used by youth and that this combined with the ability to vote an indefinite number of times would produce a flawed representation of the popularity of an artist. They claim that voting should lie with a panel of judges.

In 2006 at least five artist refused to attend the winners concert, Beach Fusion, claiming they had not entered into a performance contract with the event organisers. These claims were refuted by the organisers, who alleged the concert was solely for charity and that contestants had been briefed prior to the events

The scheme does not award monetary prizes, although each trophy is worth Sh20,000 (about US$250).

See also

Music of Kenya
Kenyan hip hop

External links
Kisima Music Awards

References

Kenyan music
African music awards
Awards established in 1994
1994 establishments in Kenya